Trivendra Kumar (born 2 March 1995) is an Indian cricketer. He made his List A debut for Services in the 2017–18 Vijay Hazare Trophy on 8 February 2018.

References

External links
 

1995 births
Living people
Indian cricketers
Place of birth missing (living people)
Services cricketers